The 2023 Daemen Wildcats men's volleyball team represents Daemen University in the 2023 NCAA Division I & II men's volleyball season. The Wildcats, led by fourth year head coach Don Gleason, play their home games at Charles L. & Gloria B. Lumsden Gymnasium. The Wildcats compete as a member of the newly created Northeast Conference men's volleyball conference and were picked to finish fourth in the NEC.

Season highlights
Will be filled in as the season progresses.

Roster

Schedule
TV/Internet Streaming information:
All home games will be streamed on NEC Front Row. Most road games will be streamed by the schools streaming service, including NEC Front Row.

 *-Indicates conference match.
 Times listed are Eastern Time Zone.

Announcers for televised games
Princeton: Ryan Maxwell & Stephanie Albano
Penn State: No commentary
American International: 
Central State: 
St. John Fisher: 
Harvard: 
American International: 
D'Youville: 
Merrimack: 
Sacred Heart: 
D'Youville: 
St. Francis Brooklyn: 
Alderson Broaddus: 
LIU: 
Concordia Irvine: 
Pepperdine: 
CSUN: 
Fairleigh Dickinson: 
St. Francis: 
LIU: 
St. Francis Brooklyn: 
Sacred Heart: 
Merrimack: 
Fairleigh Dickinson: 
St. Francis:

Rankings 

^The Media did not release a Pre-season or Week 1 poll.

References

2023 in sports in New York (state)
Daemen
Daemen